East Finchley Baptist Church is a Baptist church in Creighton Avenue, East Finchley, London. It was built in 1931 and replaced the former church next door which was converted to a church hall and is a grade II listed building with Historic England. The church hall was later converted to flats known as Ashlar Court.

References

Grade II listed buildings in the London Borough of Barnet
Gothic Revival church buildings in London
Churches in the London Borough of Barnet
Baptist churches in London
Churches completed in 1931
20th-century architecture in the United Kingdom
Grade II listed churches in London